Vaughan Williams is a surname of English origin. The best-known person with that surname, often referred to by it alone, is the English composer Ralph Vaughan Williams (18721958).

Other people named Vaughan Williams include:
 Edward Vaughan Williams (17971875), English judge, grandfather of Ralph Vaughan Williams
 Roland Vaughan Williams (18381916), English judge, uncle of Ralph Vaughan Williams
 Ursula Vaughan Williams (19112007), English poet and author, wife of Ralph Vaughan Williams
 Miles Vaughan Williams (19182016), English pharmacologist
 Bernard Vaughan Williams (1932?), former Head of Housing Department in British Hong Kong

See also 
 Singh Vaughan Williams classification, of pharmaceuticals which are antiarrhythmic agents
 Vaughan Williams (cricketer) (born 1977), Australian cricketer
 Vaughan Williams and Tavener, a studio album by Nicola Benedetti
 Vaughan Williams Memorial Library, the library and archive of the English Folk Dance and Song Society